Krak may refer to:

 another name for Krakus, a legendary Polish prince
 Thorvald Krak (1830-1908), Danish city official and founder of Kraks Forlag
 Krak Glacier, King George Island, off the coast of Antarctica
 KNCI, a radio station in  Sacramento, California, whose call sign was KRAK-FM from 1985 to 1994
 KMPS (AM), a radio station licensed to serve Hesperia, California, whose call sign was KRAK from 2001 to 2017

See also
Krak des Chevaliers, a Crusader castle in present-day Syria
Montreal (Crusader castle), originally known as Krak de Montreal